The 2010 California Vulcans football team represented California University of Pennsylvania as a member of the West Division of the Pennsylvania State Athletic Conference (PSAC) during the 2010 NCAA Division II football season. The Vulcans advanced to the NCAA Division II Football Championship playoffs, where they lost to the PSAC East Division champion, in the first round. The team's offense scored 417 points while the defense allowed 173 points. The Vulcans played home games at Adamson Stadium in California, Pennsylvania.

Schedule

References

California
California Vulcans football seasons
California Vulcans football